Willem van der Codde or Coddaeus (1574 – after 1625), was a theologian and writer from the Northern Netherlands.

Biography
He was born in Leiden as the son of Jacob van der Codde during the siege of Leiden, when his father was away in Delft. He was taught in Leiden by the professors Franciscus Raphelengius, Franciscus Junius,  Lucas Trelcatius, and Franciscus Gomarus. He became a professor there himself and taught Hebrew in Leiden to Gisbertus Voetius and Caspar Sibelius, among others. He was dismissed in 1619 for siding with Remonstrants, and imprisoned briefly in 1623 for the same reason. He was still alive in 1625 and probably died in Leiden.

Works
 Declaratio D. Jacobi Arminii, quâ coram potentissimis Hollandiae et Westfrisiae Ordinibus sententiam suam explicuil de Praedestinatione, Providentia Dei, et id genus spectantibus aliis doctrinae capitibus, in linguam Latinam conversa, Lugd. Batavorum [Leiden], 1608
 Notae ad Grammaticam Hebraeam Martini Navarri Morentini, Lugd. Bat., 1612
 Oratio funebris in laudem celeberrimi Mathematici D. Rudolphi Snellii, Lugd. Bat., 1613
 Hoseas Propheta Ebraicè et Chaldaicè cum duplici versione Latina et Commentariis Ebraicis trium doctissimorum Judaeorum, Salomonis Jarchi, Aben Ezrae et Davidis Kimchi, Masora item parva, ejusque et Commentariorum Latina quoque interpretatione; accedunt in fine succinctae annotariones Guil. Coddaei, Lugd. Bat., 1621
 Sylloge vocum versuumque proverbialium, Lugd. Bat., 1623
 Fragmenta Comoediarum Aristophanis, Lugd. Bat., 1623

References

Willem van der Codde on DBNL

External links

1574 births
1630s deaths
Dutch Calvinist and Reformed theologians
Remonstrants
Arminian writers
Arminian theologians
People from Leiden